Jean-Pierre Schneider (24 July 1946, Paris) is a French painter and scenographer. A graduate from the École des beaux-arts de Lille, he has been exhibiting since 1969 in Paris, in the province and abroad.

Exhibitions 
 2011: Villa dei Cedri, Bellinzona
 2010: Grand Théâtre d'Angers - with 
 2008:
 , Galerie du Larith, Chambéry
 Galerie Berthet-Aittouarès, Paris
 2007:
 Rencontres contemporaines with Olivier Giroud, Treigny (Yonne)
 Galerie Pome Turbil, Thonon-les-Bains
 2006:
 Galerie Uhde, Toulouse
 Galerie Pome Turbil-Jacques, Thonon-les-Bains
 Exposition autour d’une chapelle with Francis Limérat
 Galerie Sabine Puget à Château Barras (Var)
 Établissement Marengo-Jolimont, Toulouse
 Rencontres contemporaines with Olivier Giroud, Treigny
 Galerie Adama, Bordeaux
 Galerie Patrick Gauthier, Quimper
 Bookstore of Thionville with Cheyne-Editeur
 Bookstore Ombres blanches in Toulouse with 
 2005:
 Galerie Arts et Lettres, Vevey
 Galerie Artemisia, Paris
 Théâtre national de Saintes
 2004:
 Galerie Artemisia, Paris
 Galerie Art/Espace, Thonon-les-Bains
 Galerie La Passerelle des Arts, Lectoure
 Cheyne Editeur, Le Chambon-sur-Lignon
 Galerie Patrick Gauthier, Quimper
 2003:
 Centre d'Arts Plastiques, Royan
 Galerie Sabine Puget, Paris
 Galerie Art/Espace, Thonon-les-Bains
 Sainte-Marie-des-Dames
 ArtParis, Galerie Sabine Puget, Paris
 Galerie Simon Blais, Montréal
 2001:
 Galerie Art/Espace, Thonon-les-Bains
 Galerie Sabine Puget, Paris
 École supérieure des arts et de la communication, Pau
 2000:
 Theatre of Chartres (Festival Danse au Cœur)
 Academia de Bellas Artes, Sabadell
 Old carmel of Tarbes
 1999:
 Galerie Sabine Puget, Paris
 Galerie Bruno Delarue, Paris
 Galerie J.E. Bernard, Avignon
 1998:
 Alliance française, Sabadell
 , for the reading of a poem by Hisashi Okuyama (publishing of a book) read by Michael Lonsdale and F. Thuries
 Cheyne éditeur, Le Chambon-sur-Lignon
 Galerie Art/Espace, Thonon-les-Bains
 1997: Galerie Bruno Delarue, Étretat
 1996:
 Vers la blancheur, Galerie Jacob, Paris
 Galerie Lise et Henri de Menthon, Paris
 1995: Galerie Anne Bourdier, Rouen
 1994:
 Maison des Arts, Évreux
 Galerie Anne Bourdier, Rouen
 Galerie Lise et Henri de Menthon, Paris
 1993: Maison des Arts, Conches
 1992:
 Galerie Anne Bourdier, Rouen
 Galerie Lise et Henri de Menthon, Paris
 1991: Centre d'art contemporain de Jouy-sur-Eure
 1990:
 Maison Mansart, Paris
 Galerie C. Ehgner, Paris
 1989:
 Galerie du manoir, La Chaux-de-Fonds
 Galerie J. Debaigts, Paris
 1988:
 Academia de Bellas Artes et Galerie Negre, Sabadell
 Prieuré de Grandgourt
 1987: Galerie Chapon, Bordeaux
 1986: Exposition chez Paul Bigo, Les Andelys
 1975: Galerie Frère, Le Havre
 1974: Société Ricard, Rouen
 1969: Theatre of Carcassonne

Bibliography 
2003: Bernard Chambaz, Jean-Pierre Schneider, La déposition, Le Temps qu'il fait
2008: Sabine Puget, Bernard Chambaz, Une chapelle à Château Barras. Francis Limérat, Jean-Pierre Schneider, Le Temps Qu'il Fait,
2011: Bernard Chambaz, Le vif du sujet, Le Temps qu'il fait
2014: Jean-Pierre Schneider, "Que lisez-vous?": "Les mots qui vont surgir", revue L'Atelier contemporain, n° 2

External links 
 Jean-Pierre Schneider on Data.bnf.fr
 Art Aujourd'hui, Jean-Pierre Schneider. Traverser
 Jean-Pierre Schneider on NewsArtToday
 Catalogue Jean-Pierre Schneider (Arts itinérance 2014) on Camaléo 

French contemporary artists
Artists from Paris
1946 births
Living people